KMVI (900 AM) is a radio station broadcasting a sports radio format. The station is licensed to Kahului, Hawaii, United States. The station is currently owned by Pacific Radio Group, Inc., and features programming from ESPN Radio and ABC Radio. It was originally on 1310 kHz and moved to 900 kHz in 1982.

References

External links
FCC History Cards for KMVI

MVI
Sports radio stations in the United States